The following is a list of FCC-licensed radio stations in the U.S. state of Colorado, which can be sorted by their call signs, frequencies, cities of license, licensees, and programming formats.

List of radio stations

Defunct
 KAMV-LP

References

External links
 www.radiomap.us – List of radio stations in Denver, Colorado

 
Colorado
Radio stations